Central Pointe station is a light rail station in South Salt Lake, Utah, in the United States, served by all three lines of the Utah Transit Authority's (UTA) TRAX light rail system. In December 2013, the station also became the western terminus for the S Line (formerly known as Sugar House Streetcar).

Description 
The TRAX portion of the station is located at 221 West 2100 South and the streetcar portion is located at 193 West Utopia Avenue. Both portions are accessible from eastbound 2100 South, a major east–west corridor that marks the boundary between South Salt Lake and Salt Lake City. The station has one island platform for TRAX and a separate side platform for the S Line streetcar. The S Line passenger side platform is located just southeast of the TRAX island platform and is situated east of both sets of TRAX tracks, but west of the single set of tracks for the S Line. It only accessible from the southern end of the TRAX platform. The station is the southernmost station that is served by all three TRAX lines. Central Pointe opened for service on December 4, 1999 as part of the Blue Line, built in preparation for the 2002 Winter Olympics. Streetcar service began on December 8, 2013. The station has a free Park and Ride lot with about 57 parking spaces available, however, commuters are prohibited from parking in the adjoining shopping center lot. Five covered bicycle lockers are also located at the station, which must be rented from UTA in advance for a fee. Two ticket machines are located on the platform that provide single-ride, round trip, and day passes, as well as family and discounted fare tickets. The vending machines are cash-only and provide change in dollar coins and quarters only.

TRAX lines 
The Blue Line connects with the Salt Lake Intermodal Hub (Salt Lake Central) in Downtown Salt Lake City on the north (with connections to Amtrak inter-city rail and FrontRunner commuter rail) and downtown Draper (Draper Town Center) on the south. The Red Line connects with the University of Utah (University Medical Center) on the northeast and the Daybreak Community in South Jordan (Daybreak Parkway) on the southwest.  Both the Blue and Red lines connect with FrontRunner on the south at Murray Central. The Green Line connects the Salt Lake City International Airport on the northwest with West Valley City (West Valley Central) on the southwest, via Downtown Salt Lake City, to the northeast. The Green Line also connects with FrontRunner on the north at North Temple Bridge/Guadalupe.

This is the southernmost station to be serviced by all three TRAX lines, as the Green Line diverges immediately south of this station.

Streetcar 
The S Line streetcar (UTA's first streetcar) began service at the station on December 8, 2013. It runs east from this station to connect with the business district of the Sugar House neighborhood of Salt Lake City. As of the end of 2013, the S Line extends as far as the Granite Block (at about 1100 East and 2200 South), but there are plans to extend it further, having it run north from the Granite Block along 1100 East to 1700 South (near Westminster College). The streetcar passenger platform is only accessible from the southern end of the TRAX platform.

While similar to TRAX, the streetcar operates at a much slower speed and has stops placed closer together. It also consists of only one vehicle, rather than a "train" of vehicles.

References 

TRAX (light rail) stations
UTA streetcar stops
Buildings and structures in South Salt Lake, Utah
Transportation in Salt Lake County, Utah
Railway stations in Salt Lake County, Utah
1999 establishments in Utah
Railway stations in the United States opened in 1999